Events from the year 1744 in Denmark.

Incumbents
 Monarch – Christian VI
 Prime minister – Johan Ludvig Holstein-Ledreborg

Events

Undated

Births
 21 February - Cathrine Marie Møller, artist (died 1811) 
 8 March - Otto Fabricius, missionary, naturalist, ethnographer and explorer (died 1822)
 19 March – William Halling, landowner (died 1796)
 19 November - Jakob Edvard Colbjørnsen, chief justice of Supreme Court (died 1802)
 Marie Barch, first native Danish ballerina (died 1827)
 Elisabeth Christine Berling, businessperson (died 1801)

References

 
Years of the 18th century in Denmark
Denmark
Denmark
1740s in Denmark